Patricia Anne Newton  (née McGrath; born 4 February 1945) is an Australian singer, actress, dancer, stage performer and radio and television presenter.

Life and career
Prior to her marriage, Newton worked under her birth name, Patti McGrath, when she appeared on programs such as the Tarax Show and The Graham Kennedy Show. In 1967, she won the Logie Award for Most Popular Female in Victoria. She has appeared in many stage shows, and has made television appearances on Good Morning Australia and the Logie Awards.

Newton was married to fellow Australian entertainer Bert Newton from 9 November 1974 until his death on 30 October 2021. She often appeared with him and Bert Newton sometimes referred to her as "Patricia Anne Therese Bernadette McGrath Newton". She is the mother of Lauren and Matthew Newton.

Newton is a regular on 3AW's Nightline program with Philip Brady and Simon Owens, Monday nights from 10.15 pm – 11.00 pm AEST.

In 2007, Newton was a contestant on Dancing with the Stars and Deal or No Deal.

Her first grandchild was born to daughter Lauren on 19 January 2008 and her sixth grandchild was born in 2019.

On 16 May 2008, Newton was robbed at Chadstone Shopping Centre, in suburban Melbourne, while she was at a café. A bag containing a diary, cash, and jewellery inherited from her mother was stolen. Some of the items were recovered days later, and two people were later charged over the theft.
In 2018, she appeared on Who Do You Think You Are?

In 2012, Newton was one of the 12 celebrities to take part in season two of The Celebrity Apprentice Australia. She was "fired" after task 5, which involved the team on which she was part (Team Fortune) taking part in a semi-nude publicity stunt for the We Care charity. She effectively chose to leave when she requested to be the one who was fired.

Newton made a guest appearance in Neighbours as Valerie Grundy on 21 December 2018.

Discography

Studio albums

Filmography

Actress

Showbiz appearances

References

External links

  as Patti Newton
  as Patti McGrath

1945 births
Living people
Australian stage actresses
Television personalities from Melbourne
The Apprentice Australia candidates
Members of the Order of Australia
Actresses from Melbourne